Cecilia Dahlman successfully defended her title, by defeating Katia Piccolini 7–5, 7–5 in the final.

Seeds

Draw

Finals

Top half

Bottom half

References

External links
 Official results archive (ITF)
 Official results archive (WTA)

Athens Trophy
1990 WTA Tour